"X" is a song by American singer Nicky Jam and Colombian singer J Balvin. Written by the two singers, Juan Diego Medina, Giordano Ashruf and its producers, Jeon and Afro Bros, it was released by Sony Music Latin on March 2, 2018. It is a Spanish dancehall song, featuring a synth trumpet hook and elements of reggae, reggaeton, Latin pop and Afrobeats. A Spanglish version of the song was released on April 27, 2018. On June 28, 2018, a remix version featuring vocals by artists Maluma and Ozuna was released. The accompanying audio was also released on Nicky Jam's YouTube channel on the same day. The song topped the charts in Spain, Italy, Portugal, Bolivia, El Salvador, Panama, Paraguay and Peru. Nicky Jam performed the song solo during the 2018 FIFA World Cup closing ceremony.

Music video
The music video for "X" was filmed in Miami and directed by Jessy Terrero. It was released on March 1, 2018, on Nicky Jam's YouTube account. It features Nicky Jam and J Balvin dancing in a vibrant colored room inside a plane. As of February 2020, the video has over 1.8 billion views on YouTube. Writing for NPR, Sidney Madden described the video as "a clean and vivid affair", likening it to Sean Paul's "I'm Still in Love with You" and Drake's "Hotline Bling".

Track listings

Charts

Weekly charts

Remix

Monthly charts

Year-end charts

Decade-end charts

Certifications

|-
!colspan="4"|Remix only
|-

See also
List of number-one hits of 2018 (Italy)
List of number-one songs of 2018 (Mexico)
List of number-one singles of 2018 (Spain)
List of Billboard number-one Latin songs of 2018

References

External links

2018 singles
2018 songs
Nicky Jam songs
J Balvin songs
Number-one singles in Italy
Number-one singles in Portugal
Number-one singles in Spain
Songs written by Nicky Jam
Songs written by J Balvin
Music videos directed by Jessy Terrero